François Thierry de Crussol is a French numismatist, specialising in East Asian currency. (His Chinese name is 蒂埃里 Di Ali).

Career 
Thierry is honorary curator at the Département des Monnaies et Médailles, Bibliothèque nationale de France. Before retirement he was curator of Oriental coins, and a leading scholar in this field, having produced several well-received books, catalogues of the BnF collection, and numerous articles relating to East Asian numismatics.

Awards and honours 

 2006 Awarded the Medal of the Royal Numismatic Society
 2017 Awarded the Prix Hirayama - by the Académie des Inscriptions et Belles Lettres - for his book Les monnaies de la Chine ancienne, des origines à la fin de l'Empire (Paris, Les Belles-Lettres, 2017).

Publications 
This is a selection of Thierry's works.

Selected Books

 2017 - Les monnaies de la Chine ancienne, des origines à la fin de l'Empire (Paris, Les Belles-Lettres)
 2016 - Royaume du lion, ceylan connu des chinois des origines à la fin des song.(Turnhout: Brepols Publishers)
 2016 - (with A.C. Fang, eds) The Language and Iconography of Chinese Coin Charms: Deciphering a Past Belief System (Berlin and Heidelberg: Springer)
 2014 - Le Trésor de Huê, Une face cachée de la colonisation de l'Indochine (Paris: Nouveau Monde éditions)
 2014 - Monnaies chinoises, IV- Des Liao aux Ming du Sud (Paris: Bibliothèque nationale de France)
 2013 - La Ruine du Qin, Ascension, triomphe et mort du premier empereur de Chine (Paris: La Librairie Vuibert)
 2003 - Monnaies chinoises, II- Des Qin aux Cinq Dynasties (Paris: Bibliothèque nationale de France)
 2002 - Catalogue des monnaies vietnamiennes- Supplément (Paris: Bibliothèque nationale de France)
 2001 - (with M. Amandry, M. Dhénin, M. Popoff and C. Vellet) Dictionnaire de Numismatique (Paris: Larousse)
 1997 - Monnaies chinoises, I-  L'Antiquité préimpériale (Paris: Bibliothèque nationale de France)
 1995 - Les monnaies chinoises de Pacifique Chardin (Lille)
 1992 - Monnaies de Chine (Paris: Bibliothèque Nationale)
 1988 - Catalogue des monnaies vietnamiennes (Paris: Bibliothèque nationale)
 1987 - Amulettes de Chine et du Vietnam, rites magiques et symbolique de la Chine ancienne (Paris: Le Léopard d'or)
 1986 - Monnaies d'Extrême Orient (Paris: Administration des monnaies et médailles)

Selected Articles

 2011 - "The Confucian Message on Vietnamese Coins A closer look at the Nguyễn dynasty's large coins with moral maxims", Numismatic Chronicle 171, pp. 367–406.
 2007 - "Identification of the Nguyên Thông Coins of the Cảnh Hirng Period (1740 -1786)", Numismatic Chronicle 167, pp. 237–241.

References

External links 
Thierry on Academia
Thierry on Worldcat

Living people
French curators
Chinese numismatics
Year of birth missing (living people)